= Medical study =

Medical study could refer to:

- The study of medicine
- A clinical trial
